Lautiosaari is a village in the municipality of Keminmaa in Lapland in north-western Finland.

See also
Lautiosaari (railway junction)

External links
Satellite map at Maplandia

Villages in Finland
Keminmaa